Rotundabaloghia is a genus of tortoise mites in the family Uropodidae. There are about 16 described species in Rotundabaloghia.

Species
These 16 species belong to the genus Rotundabaloghia:

 Rotundabaloghia browni
 Rotundabaloghia bukavuensis
 Rotundabaloghia erinacea
 Rotundabaloghia ermilovi
 Rotundabaloghia hongkongensis Kontschán, 2015
 Rotundabaloghia iquitosensis Hirschmann, 1992
 Rotundabaloghia javaensis
 Rotundabaloghia kaydani
 Rotundabaloghia lindqvistiformis
 Rotundabaloghia magna Hirschmann, 1992
 Rotundabaloghia rwandae
 Rotundabaloghia singaporica Hirschmann, 1975
 Rotundabaloghia splendida
 Rotundabaloghia tobiasi Hirschmann, 1975
 Rotundabaloghia ukoguruensis
 Rotundabaloghia wangi

References

Uropodidae
Articles created by Qbugbot